Bryukhovo is a rural locality (a village) in Nikolskoye Rural Settlement, Kaduysky District, Vologda Oblast, Russia. The population was 4 as of 2002.

Geography 
Bryukhovo is located 41 km northeast of Kaduy (the district's administrative centre) by road. Semenskaya is the nearest rural locality.

References 

Rural localities in Kaduysky District